Lincolnville may refer to:

Places
Canada
 Lincolnville, York Region, Ontario, a community in the town of Whitchurch-Stouffville
 Lincolnville, Nova Scotia

United States
 Lincolnville Historic District, a U.S. Historic District located in St. Augustine, Florida
 Lincolnville, Indiana
 Lincolnville, Kansas
 Lincolnville, Maine
 Lincolnville, Pennsylvania
 Lincolnville, South Carolina
 
Australia
 a neighbourhood with a closed post office within the Melbourne suburb of Keilor East, Victoria